Government High School for Boys may refer to:

Government High School for Boys, Basti Nau, Punjab, Pakistan
Government High School for Boys, Salarwala, Punjab, Pakistan

See also
Government High School Jhelum, Punjab, Pakistan
Government High School Bogray, Punjab, Pakistan
Government High School Pakkay Wala, Punjab, Pakistan
Government Laboratory High School, Bangladesh
Annada Government High School, Bangladesh
Ballygunge Government High School, West Bengal, India
Barasat Peary Charan Sarkar Government High School, West Bengal, India
Barrackpore Government High School, West Bengal, India
Cox's Bazar Government High School, Bangladesh
Dhanmondi Government Boys' High School, Bangladesh
Feni Government Pilot High School, Bangladesh
Gaibandha Government Boys' High School, Bangladesh
Harimohon Government High School, Bangladesh
Hasan Ali Government High School, Bangladesh
Kishoregonj Government Boys' High School, Bangladesh
Lakshmipur Adarsha Samad Government High School, Bangladesh
Manirampur Government High School, Bangladesh
Mohammadpur Government High School, Bangladesh
Motijheel Government Boys' High School, Bangladesh
Naogaon K.D. Government High School, Bangladesh
Nasirabad Government High School, Bangladesh
Natore Government Boys High School, Bangladesh
Nripendra Narayan Government High School, Bangladesh
Patuakhali Government Jubilee High School, Bangladesh
Rani Bilashmoni Government Boys' High School, Bangladesh
Satkhira Government High School, Bangladesh
Sher-e-Bangla Nagar Government Boys' High School, Bangladesh
Sylhet Government Pilot High School, Bangladesh
Taki Government High School, West Bengal, India
Government Boys' HS School Ground, Karimganj, India